Nayanmoni Saikia (born 21 September 1988) is a female Indian international lawn bowler.

Bowls career

Commonwealth Games 
Saikia has represented India at three Commonwealth Games; in the triples and fours at the 2014 Commonwealth Games, in the pairs and fours at the 2018 Commonwealth Games and in the pairs and fours at the 2022 Commonwealth Games. In the 2022 competition, she was part of the Indian Women's fours team, along with Lovely Choubey, Pinki Singh and Rupa Rani Tirkey which won gold medal beating South Africa in the final, 17-10.

Asian Championships 
In the Asian Lawn Bowls Championship, Saikia has won gold in women's triples in 2017 and bronze in women's fours in 2018. She has been awarded Arjuna Award in 2022 by Government of India.

In 2023, she won the fours gold medal at the 14th Asian Lawn Bowls Championship in Kuala Lumpur.

References 

1988 births
Living people
Indian bowls players
People from Golaghat
Sportswomen from Assam
Bowls players at the 2014 Commonwealth Games
Bowls players at the 2018 Commonwealth Games
Bowls players at the 2022 Commonwealth Games
Commonwealth Games gold medallists for India
Commonwealth Games medallists in lawn bowls
Recipients of the Arjuna Award
Medallists at the 2022 Commonwealth Games